Risk, Hazards & Crisis in Public Policy (RHCPP) is a quarterly peer-reviewed academic journal published by Wiley-Blackwell on behalf of the Policy Studies Organization. The journal was established in 2010 and the editor-in-chief is Dr. Sanneke Kuipers (Leiden University). It is abstracted and indexed in the ProQuest databases Social Services Abstracts and Worldwide Political Sciences Abstracts.

External links 
 

English-language journals
Publications established in 2010
Political science journals
Quarterly journals
Wiley-Blackwell academic journals